Resurrection is a 1931 Spanish-language adaptation of Leo Tolstoy's 1899 novel Resurrection produced by Universal Studios, the same year they made the first English-language all-talking version of the film.  The film was directed by Eduardo Arozamena and David Selman and starred Gilbert Roland and Lupe Vélez, who also starred in the English-language version.

Cast
Lupe Vélez - Katyusha Maslova
Gilbert Roland - Prince Dmitir Nekhludov (*as Luis Alonso)
Miguel Faust Rocha - Capitan Shenbok
Soledad Jimenez - Maria
Amelia Senisterra - Princess Sofia
Eduardo Arozamena
Blanca de Castejón
Ramón Pereda - ?unknown

External links
 
 

1931 films
Films based on Resurrection
American black-and-white films
1930s Spanish-language films
Spanish-language American films
1931 drama films
American drama films
American multilingual films
Films set in Russia
1931 multilingual films
Films directed by David Selman
1930s American films